Geoffrey Gould (born 7 January 1945) is an English former professional footballer who made 133 appearances in the Football League playing on the left wing for Bradford Park Avenue, Lincoln City and Notts County. He also played in Australia for South Melbourne.

References

1945 births
Living people
Footballers from Blackburn
English footballers
Association football wingers
Bradford (Park Avenue) A.F.C. players
Lincoln City F.C. players
Notts County F.C. players
South Melbourne FC players
English Football League players
Expatriate soccer players in Australia
English expatriates in Australia